"Whatcha Wanna Do About It" is a song recorded by Canadian country music artist Madeline Merlo for her debut studio album, Free Soul (2016). The song was written by Connie Harrington, Matt McGinn, and Steve Moakler, and was produced by Matt Rovey. It was released January 22, 2016 as the album's fourth official single. Following its release, "Whatcha Wanna Do About It" became Merlo's fastest-rising single and earned Merlo her first top ten single on the Canada Country chart.

Content
"Whatcha Wanna Do About It" describes a relatable situation in which two people "dance around" their feelings for each other, with Merlo attempting to break the cycle by asking her love interest to make a move.

Promotion
Merlo appeared on Breakfast Television Toronto on June 2, 2016 to promote the single.

Chart performance
"Whatcha Wanna Do About It" debuted on the Canada Country chart dated February 27, 2016. In its tenth week, on the chart dated March 30, 2016, the song reached its peak position of 10. "Whatcha Wanna Do About It" also reached number 43 on the comprehensive Canada All-Format Airplay chart, her first entry on the tally.

Music video
An accompanying video for "Whatcha Wanna Do About It" was directed by Adam Rothlein and filmed in Los Angeles, California. The video premiered through select radio stations on February 5, 2016 and was made available everywhere on February 10, 2016.

Charts

References

2016 songs
2016 singles
Madeline Merlo songs
Open Road Recordings singles
Songs written by Connie Harrington
Songs written by Matt McGinn (songwriter)
Songs written by Steve Moakler